Haliru Ibrahim Bologi Umaru Chatta (1 September 195819 March 2019) was a Nigerian first class traditional ruler of the Patigi Emirate as Etsu Patigi from 1999 to 2001.

He was turbaned as the Etsu Patigi since 1999 spending twenty years on the throne. He succeeded Etsu Idirisu Gana, who had ruled from 1966 to 1996.  Chatta was succeeded by his son Eu Umaru Bologi II.

Education 
He attended the Government Secondary School, Illorin from 1969 to 1972.

Turbaning 
After he was turbaned as the Etsu Patigi in 1999, he became the vice-chairman of the Kwara State Traditional Council.

Chatta died after a brief illness at Abuja general hospital.

Families 
The monarch was survived by five wives with thirty children.

Notes 

1958 births
2019 deaths
People from Kwara State
Etsu Patigi
Nigerian traditional rulers
Nupe
Nigerian people by ethnic or national origin